Bathymicrops multispinis is a species of aulopiformes in the family Ipnopidae.

References 

Ipnopidae
Animals described in 1992